Loganair is a Scottish regional airline based at Glasgow Airport near Paisley, Scotland. It is the largest regional airline in the UK by passenger numbers and fleet size.

In addition to its main base at Glasgow, it has hubs at Aberdeen, Edinburgh, Inverness and Newcastle airports. It holds a United Kingdom Civil Aviation Authority Type A Operating Licence, permitting it to carry passengers, cargo and mail on aircraft with 20 or more seats.

History

Early years
 

Loganair was established on 1 February 1962 by Willie Logan of the Logan Construction Company Ltd, operating as its air charter arm with a Piper PA-23 Aztec based at Edinburgh.

In 1967, Loganair took delivery of three Britten-Norman Islander twin-engine eight-seat light commuter airliners and began regular flights between the Orkney Islands, and started operating in Shetland in 1970. In 1966, after Renfrew Airport closed, the airline established its head office at Glasgow Airport. This aspect of Loganair's operations ceased on 31 March 2006 when the new contract for air ambulance work was awarded to Gama Aviation.

Between 1968 and 1983, the company was owned by the Royal Bank of Scotland,  Towards the end of this period, Loganair bought Short 360 and Fokker F27 Friendship aircraft. The company brought jet aircraft into the fleet with two British Aerospace 146s. In December 1983 it became a subsidiary of the Airlines of Britain Group. Further aircraft were added to the fleet: British Aerospace Jetstream 31, British Aerospace Jetstream 41, and British Aerospace ATP aircraft. In the late 1980s Loganair was the fastest-growing scheduled operator at Manchester Airport, and, in terms of number of flights, was the airport's second-busiest carrier.

In 1993, the airline became a franchisee of British Airways, operating its Islanders in the British Airways livery. This would stand until July 2008, when it became the new franchisee of Flybe.

After a restructure of British Midland Group in 1994, Loganair's routes outside Scotland and the aircraft used to operate them were transferred to Manx Airlines. This consolidation of services led to the formation of a new airline, British Regional Airline (BRA Ltd). In 1997, with Loganair now consisting of six aircraft (one de Havilland Canada DHC-6 Twin Otter and five Britten Norman Islanders) and 44 staff, a management buy-out occurred.

Operations as Flybe franchise and later developments
In June 2005, Loganair was awarded a contract from the Irish Government to operate a daily return service from Knock, County Mayo to Dublin. This public service obligation (PSO) route operated for a period of three years as British Airways, with effect from 22 July 2005. The operation ceased in July 2008, the contract having been lost to Aer Arann. The airline also bought routes from Citiexpress in March 2004.

Until October 2008, Loganair was a British Airways franchisee, operating flights sold through BA using BA flight codes. Loganair's inter-island operations between the Orkney and Shetland Islands carried out using Britten-Norman Islanders were removed from the franchise agreement in 2004. The flights have since been marketed under Loganair's own name, rather than British Airways'. Loganair became a franchise airline of Flybe, operating in the Flybe colours. Flights are also operated under a codeshare agreement with British Airways connecting flights from Scotland to London.  The franchise has been criticised by residents in the Scottish islands for what they perceive to be excessively high fares, and a Facebook campaign set up in June 2015 to highlight the issue attracted over 7400 "likes" over the course of its first weekend.

On 8 July 2011, it was announced that Loganair had agreed to purchase Cambridge based ScotAirways. ScotAirways continued to trade as a separate entity (using its original name of Suckling Airways) and holding its own licences and approvals until April 2013.

Services to Belfast and to Birmingham from Dundee ended on 2 December 2012. After CityJet had terminated its services between Dundee and London City Airport in January 2014, Loganair took over the route, operating from Dundee to London Stansted Airport, with the support of a PSO agreement.

In May 2015, two Viking Air  DHC-6-400 Twin Otter aircraft were acquired by Highlands and Islands Airports to be operated by Loganair on the Scottish Government's Public Service Obligation routes between Glasgow and Campbeltown, Tiree and Barra. In August 2015 the airline became part of a new regional airline group, Airline Investments Limited (AIL), along with East Midlands-based airline bmi regional.

On 21 November 2016, Flybe and Loganair announced that their franchise agreement would terminate on 31 August 2017. Despite headlines, it is unclear who initiated the termination. Loganair later relaunched its website without renewed interline agreements with Flybe or Aer Lingus.

In April 2017, pending the termination of the Flybe franchise agreement, Loganair unveiled its new independent corporate livery on Saab 340B Freighter G-LGNN. From 1 September the airline began operating "in its own right" for the first time in 24 years. Loganair signed a codeshare agreement with British Airways (BA), effective from 1 September 2017 (coinciding with the launch of independent operations), allowing passengers to book through flights onto BA's global network.

Reactions to the demise of other airlines
In February 2019, following Flybmi's cessation of operations, Loganair announced that it was to take over Flybmi's routes from Aberdeen to Bristol, Oslo and Esbjerg, from Newcastle to Stavanger and Brussels, and from City of Derry Airport to London-Stansted. A BALPA tribunal into Loganair's swift action following the closure of Flybmi found that the carrier had been acting lawfully, despite the fact that it had created several contingency plans for the demise of UK airlines Eastern Airways and Flybe.

In March 2020, following Flybe's cessation of operations, Loganair announced that it was to take over several Flybe routes from Scotland and Newcastle.

Potential sale
In October 2022, Loganair confirmed that the existing sole owners, brothers Stephen (age 72) and Peter Bond (age 61), were seeking a buyer to act as the company's "custodian for the next generation".

Destinations

, Loganair serves 44 destinations in the United Kingdom, the Isle of Man, the Republic of Ireland and continental Europe. Part of Loganair's operations includes the world's shortest scheduled commercial route, between Westray Airport and Papa Westray Airport, a distance of 1.7 miles, and the use of Barra Airport, the only airport in the world to use a beach as a runway.
After the collapse of Flybe in March 2020, Loganair took over a number of former Flybe routes from Scotland, the North of England and other parts of the UK, with service beginning as little as 10 days later.

Codeshare agreements 
Loganair has codeshare agreements with the following airlines (as of April 2022):
 Aurigny
 Blue Islands
 British Airways
KLM

Interline agreements 
Loganair has interline agreements with the following airlines (as of February 2022):

 Air France
 Air Transat
 Emirates
 Etihad Airways
 Ethiopian Airlines
 Finnair
 Qatar Airways
 Singapore Airlines
 Turkish Airlines
 United Airlines
 Widerøe

Fleet

Current fleet
, the Loganair fleet consists of the following aircraft:

Fleet development
In June 2018, it was announced that Loganair planned to add at least a further two Embraer ERJ-145 aircraft for the start of the summer 2019 schedule. The aircraft were to be transferred to Loganair from its sister company Flybmi and would initially be used to operate flights from Loganair's Glasgow base to Derry and Stornoway. Loganair planned to eventually use the Embraer ERJ-145 aircraft to launch new routes to European airports that were not then served from Glasgow.

Embraer ERJ-145s were previously operated by Flybmi on behalf of Loganair on the Inverness to Bergen, Dublin and Manchester routes before the airline acquired its first ERJ-135 in November 2018. Also in November 2018, it was announced that around twenty ATR 42 aircraft would be phased into its fleet to replace the Saab 2000 and Saab 340 aircraft in the third quarter of 2019.

Loganair planned to introduce electric aircraft to the Orkney Islands by 2021 due to the short distance between the islands that would make such flights possible.

Loganair  continued to follow its fleet simplification programme through 2019 by phasing out the small subfleets of Dornier 328 and Saab 2000s to focus on the Saab 340 and Embraer ERJ families in the near term before the gradual phase-in of the ATR 42 fleet. By April 2019, the D328 fleet had already been Withdrawn From Use (WFU) and stored.

Loganair returned the last of its Saab 2000 aircraft to the lessor on 25 March 2020.
Its Saab 340s are due to be retired by mid 2023, to be replaced by 8 new ATRs which will complement the existing ATR fleet.

Former fleet

Accidents and incidents

 On 12 June 1986, a DHC-6 Twin Otter aircraft with 16 people on board struck high ground on the island of Islay in poor weather. The pilots had mistakenly identified the coastal village of Laphroaig as the town of Port Ellen, near Islay's Glenegedale Airport. There was one fatality, a pilot.
 In 1996, a Britten-Norman Islander was destroyed in Shetland. The accident occurred during a night time return flight to the aircraft's home base following a medical evacuation flight. The aircraft crashed short of the runway whilst attempting to land after a previous discontinued approach in strong gusting cross winds. The pilot had exercised his discretion to extend the period for which he was allowed to fly that day. The pilot's medical certificate had expired nineteen days earlier thus invalidating his pilot's licence. The pilot was killed in the crash and a doctor on board was seriously injured; a nurse seated at the rear of the aircraft sustained minor injuries.
 On 27 February 2001, Flight 670, a Short 360 registered G-BNMT operating a Royal Mail flight to Belfast, crashed into the Firth of Forth shortly after taking off from Edinburgh at 1730GMT. Both crew members were killed. There were no passengers on board. An Air Accidents Investigation Branch (AAIB) inquiry later blamed a buildup of slush in the aircraft's engines for the crash. Protective covers had not been fitted to the engine intakes while the aircraft was parked for several hours in heavy snow at Edinburgh.
 On 15 March 2005, a Britten-Norman Islander crashed into the sea while descending toward Campbeltown Airport in western Scotland. The aircraft was operating on an unscheduled air ambulance flight. Both occupants, the pilot and one passenger (a paramedic with the Scottish Ambulance Service), died in the crash.
On 15 December 2014, Flight 6780, a Saab 2000 registered G-LGNO, was struck by lightning whilst approaching Sumburgh Airport. The flight subsequently suffered from control difficulties and nosedived from  after the crew tried taking over the controls, but failed to notice that the autopilot was still engaged. The aircraft then declared a mayday and returned to Aberdeen Airport. There were 33 occupants onboard and no injuries were reported.
On 16 June 2020, a Loganair Embraer ERJ-145EP registered as G-SAJS sustained minor damage at its stand on the apron at Aberdeen Airport after it was struck in a low-speed collision by a Bombardier Dash 8 Q400 registered as G-JECK. The Dash 8, wearing the livery of the defunct airline Flybe, became wedged underneath the ERJ's right hand engine. No passengers were aboard either aircraft the time of the collision, and no injuries were reported.

See also 

 Bryan Sutherland, engineer

References

Citations

Bibliography
Iain Hutchison, The Story of Loganair (1987)  Western Isles Publishing
Roy Calderwood, Times subject to Tides: the story of Barra Airport (1999) 
Iain Hutchison, Air Ambulance: sixty years of the Scottish Air Ambulance Service (1996) 
Tony Merton-Jones, British Independent Airlines 1946-1976 (2000) The Aviation Hobby Shop, West Drayton, Middlesex. 
Guy Warner, Orkney by Air (2005) 
Captain Alan Whitfield, Island Pilot (2007)

External links 

Airlines of Scotland
Airlines of the United Kingdom
Airlines established in 1962
Companies based in Paisley, Renfrewshire
Former Oneworld affiliate members
1962 establishments in Scotland
Organisations associated with Shetland